Maya Rudolph (born July 27, 1972) is an American actress, comedian, and singer. In 2000, she became a cast member on the NBC sketch comedy show Saturday Night Live (SNL), and during her tenure on the show, she played supporting roles in the films 50 First Dates (2004), A Prairie Home Companion (2006), and Idiocracy (2006).

Since leaving SNL in 2007, Rudolph has appeared in several more films, including Grown Ups (2010), Bridesmaids (2011), Inherent Vice (2014), Sisters (2015), CHiPs (2017), Life of the Party (2018), Wine Country (2019), and Disenchanted (2022). She has also provided voice acting roles for the animated films Shrek the Third (2007), Big Hero 6 (2014), The Angry Birds Movie (2016), The Emoji Movie (2017), The Willoughbys (2020), The Mitchells vs. the Machines (2021), and Luca (2021).

From 2011 to 2012, Rudolph starred as Ava Alexander in the NBC sitcom Up All Night. In 2016, she co-hosted the variety series Maya & Marty with Martin Short. Since 2017, she has voiced various characters in the Netflix animated sitcom Big Mouth, including Connie the Hormone Monstress, which won her Primetime Emmy Awards in 2020 and 2021. For her portrayal of United States senator and vice-presidential candidate Kamala Harris on Saturday Night Live, Rudolph won the Primetime Emmy Award for Outstanding Guest Actress in a Comedy Series

Rudolph appeared in the NBC fantasy comedy series The Good Place (2018–2020), for which she received three Primetime Emmy Award nominations. From 2019 to 2021, she starred in the Fox animated sitcom Bless the Harts. In 2022, she began starring in the comedy series Loot, also serving as an executive producer.

Early life
Rudolph was born on July 27, 1972, in Gainesville, Florida, to singer-songwriter Minnie Riperton and composer Richard Rudolph. Her mother was African-American and her father is Ashkenazi Jewish. Her paternal grandfather was Sidney Rudolph, a philanthropist who once owned all of the Wendy's and Rudy's restaurants in Miami-Dade County, Florida. Her great-grandfather was born in Vilnius, Lithuania, changed his surname from "Rudashevsky" to "Rudolph", and was one of the founding members of Congregation Beth Shalom, a Conservative Jewish synagogue in the Squirrel Hill neighborhood of Pittsburgh, Pennsylvania. Rudolph's godmother was R&B singer Teena Marie.

Rudolph's parents moved to Los Angeles, California, when her brother Marc and she were very young, and they grew up primarily in the Westwood neighborhood. Near the end of the song "Lovin' You", Riperton repeats "Maya". She incorporated this into her performance on The Midnight Special. Her mother died of breast cancer on July 12, 1979, at age 31, two weeks before Maya's seventh birthday. In 1990, Rudolph graduated from Crossroads School in Santa Monica, California, where she befriended schoolmates Gwyneth Paltrow and Jack Black. She attended the University of California, Santa Cruz, living in Porter College. She graduated in 1995 with a Bachelor of Arts degree in photography.

Career

Television and film
Rudolph was in the improv troupe the Groundlings, where she met future Saturday Night Live cast member Will Forte. She joined the cast of Saturday Night Live as a featured player for the final three episodes of the 1999–2000 season through 2007. She has made several cameo appearances over the years. Since the 45th-season premiere, she has occasionally portrayed Vice President Kamala Harris, a performance acknowledged by Harris.

She has appeared in many other television shows, including the CBS medical drama series City of Angels and Chicago Hope. She had small parts in Chuck & Buck, Gattaca, As Good as It Gets, Duplex, and Duets; she was also a music supervisor for Duets. Her first prominent film role came in 2006 with A Prairie Home Companion. Earlier, she had costarred with Luke Wilson in the 2005 Mike Judge sci-fi comedy Idiocracy, although that film was shelved until September 2006 and then only given a limited release. She also guest-starred as Rapunzel in the DreamWorks animated film Shrek the Third. She guest-starred as Julia in The Simpsons episode "The Homer of Seville". Rudolph guest-starred as character Athena Scooberman in NBC's Kath & Kim, and starred in the film Away We Go with The Office star John Krasinski. In 2010, she appeared in Grown Ups starring Adam Sandler, where she played the wife of Chris Rock's character. In 2011, she appeared in Bridesmaids with Saturday Night Live colleague Kristen Wiig, and in 2013 she played a supporting role in The Way, Way Back as the girlfriend of Sam Rockwell's character. She co-starred in the NBC sitcom Up All Night, with Christina Applegate and Will Arnett. Rudolph's self-titled variety show television pilot aired on May 19, 2014, but the show did not go beyond that. It was later announced that she would star in an NBC variety series Maya & Marty with Martin Short, which debuted on May 31, 2016. Her next series, Forever, premiered on September 14, 2018, on Amazon Video. As a voice actress, she had various roles in the Netflix animated series Big Mouth, premiering in 2017.

In 2018, she performed in advertisements for Ruby Tuesday and Seventh Generation. In 2019 she appeared as the mother in The Lego Movie 2: The Second Part. In 2021 she voiced Linda Mitchell, mother of two, in Sony Pictures' The Mitchells vs. the Machines, and Daniela Paguro in the Pixar film Luca. In July 2022 she appeared as the star of Loot, an Apple TV+ series. In 2022, Rudolph portrayed Malvina Monroe, the main antagonist of Disenchanted, the sequel to the 2007 Disney film Enchanted.

Rudolph has a production company called Animal Pictures with Natasha Lyonne which has produced Russian Doll, Poker Face, Loot and the upcoming animated series The Hospital.

Since January 2023, Rudolph has been the spokesperson for M&M's after owner Mars Incorporated pulled its "Spokescandies" in light of criticism for its depictions of gender. Although a few days later, Mars confirmed that their Spokescandies would return in their Super Bowl commercial.

Music
Prior to joining Saturday Night Live, Rudolph was a backing singer (1995–1999) and briefly a keyboardist in the band the Rentals, with whom she toured. She appears in music videos for the songs "Waiting" and "Please Let That Be You". She sang backing vocals for "Barcelona" and "My Head Is in the Sun", both from the album Seven More Minutes. In 2004, she recorded a track with the Rentals frontman Matt Sharp, including a cover of Tegan and Sara's "Not Tonight". She performed "Together in Pooping" and "Little Roundworm" with Triumph the Insult Comic Dog (Robert Smigel) on his album Come Poop With Me. She is in a Prince cover band called Princess with her friend Gretchen Lieberum.

Personal life
Rudolph has been in a relationship with filmmaker Paul Thomas Anderson since 2001. They live in the San Fernando Valley with their four children.

Filmography

Film

Television

Video games

Music videos

Awards and nominations

Notes

References

External links

 
 

1972 births
20th-century African-American women singers
20th-century American actresses
20th-century American comedians
21st-century African-American women singers
21st-century American actresses
21st-century American comedians
21st-century American singers
21st-century American women singers
Actresses from Gainesville, Florida
Actresses from Los Angeles
African-American actresses
African-American female comedians
African-American Jews
American film actresses
American impressionists (entertainers)
American keyboardists
American people of Lithuanian-Jewish descent
American sketch comedians
American television actresses
American voice actresses
American women comedians
Audiobook narrators
Comedians from California
Crossroads School alumni
Jewish American actresses
Jewish American comedians
Jewish singers
Living people
Musicians from Gainesville, Florida
People from Westwood, Los Angeles
Primetime Emmy Award winners
Singers from Los Angeles
The Rentals members
University of California, Santa Cruz alumni
Disney people